The San Diego Stingrays were a charter member of International Basketball League (IBL) and played at the San Diego Sports Arena and was owned by online sports gaming entrepreneur Scott Atkins. The following season, the team returned to San Diego under the name, San Diego Wildfire, along with new ownership and management.

In June 1999, San Diego hired former San Diego State Aztecs men's basketball head coach Smokey Gaines to helm the team. Former National Basketball Association (NBA) player Jeff Malone was hired as Gains' assistant coach in July 1999. Bill Tosheff was the director of basketball operations for the Stingrays. Rapper Master P, who had previously played in the NBA pre-season, signed with the Stingrays in November 1999. 

The Stingrays first home game in 1999 was attended by 9,786 people—an IBL best. The San Diego Stingrays had a dance team as well that participated in several community events. They were led by director Demilo Young and Sheila Christensen.

See also
San Diego Siege
San Diego Surf
San Diego Wildcards

References

External links
1999-2000 San Diego Stingrays via funwhileitlasted.net

Basketball teams in San Diego
Basketball teams in California
International Basketball League (1999–2001) teams